The Egyptian Ministry of Defense is the ministry responsible for the Egyptian Armed Forces organization and manages its affairs and maintains its facilities. It also handles the affairs of colleges and military recruitment, mobilization and management of veterans and military factories in Egypt through the Armed Forces Management and Administration Agency. Egypt's Ministry of Defense is based in Cairo and the headquarters is called The Octagon, located in the New Administrative Capital.

List of ministers 

The following is a list of ministers of Defence of Egypt since the Egyptian revolution of 1952. The position was known until 14 May 1971 as the Minister of War. The Minister direct the Egyptian Armed Forces. Article 201 of the Constitution of Egypt states that the Minister is the Commander-in-Chief of the Armed Forces, and shall be appointed from among its officers.

* Incumbent's time in office last updated: .

Timeline

Agencies and departments 

 Armed Forces Arming Authority
 Armed Forces Engineering Authority
 Armed Forces Finance Authority
 Armed Forces Logistics Authority
 Armed Forces Management and Administration
 Armed Forces Training Authority
 Military Operations Authority
 Military justice
 Morale Affairs

See also 

 Cabinet of Egypt
 Egyptian Armed Forces
 Chief of Staff of the Armed Forces (Egypt)

References

External links 

 Egypt's Cabinet Database

Government ministries of Egypt
Egyptian military-related lists
Defence Ministers of Egypt
Egypt
Military of Egypt